Cèsar Martinell i Brunet (Valls, 24 December 1888 - Barcelona, 19 November 1973) was a Catalan modernista architect. He was part of the small and selected group of architects that were connected to Antoni Gaudí, his most important teacher. As a multifaceted person, Martinell was also a researcher and art historian. He became famous for the many wine cellars he made for the agriculture cooperatives of different towns throughout Catalonia, especially in the south, in the Province of Tarragona. These are known as "the cathedrals of wine".

Artistic style
 
Cèsar Martinell artistic style was primarily Modernisme, with some Noucentisme. His masterpieces were his designs for wineries, which are called the cathedrals of wine (les catedrals del vi) due to their magnificence. The use of traditional architectural techniques and materials helped to build these monumental buildings. His wine cathedrals are located in several cities of Catalonia such as Falset, Nulles, Cornudella de Montsant, Montblanc and Gandesa, and some of them can be visited. He also designed the flour mill of Cervera and he managed restoration projects, such as the Basilica of Santa Maria in Igualada.

Photo gallery

Notes

1888 births
1973 deaths
Architects from Catalonia
People from Valls
Modernisme architects